T-complex protein 1 subunit alpha is a protein that in humans is encoded by the TCP1 gene.

Function 

This gene encodes a molecular chaperone that is a member of the TRiC complex. This complex consists of two identical stacked rings, each containing eight different proteins. Unfolded polypeptides enter the central cavity of the complex and are folded in an ATP-dependent manner. The complex folds various proteins, including actin and tubulin. Alternate transcriptional splice variants of this gene, encoding different isoforms, have been characterized.

Interactions 

T-complex 1 has been shown to interact with PPP4C and HDAC3. CCT also directly interacts with lectin type oxidized LDL receptor-1 (LOX-1) while its ligand oxidized low density lipoprotein (OxLDL) disassociates CCT from LOX-1.

Notes

References

Further reading